William Ellam Allen (1880-1960) was an acting director of the U.S. Bureau of Investigation (BOI) during 1919. The BOI was a predecessor of the Federal Bureau of Investigation (FBI).

A former assistant in war matters to the chief of the Bureau of Investigation, Allen was appointed acting director on February 10, 1919. Allen resigned the post from June 30, 1919, and was replaced by William J. Flynn.

References

Directors of the Federal Bureau of Investigation
People from Texas
1880 births
1960 deaths